Brooklyn is an unincorporated community in Schuyler County, Illinois, United States.

References

Unincorporated communities in Schuyler County, Illinois
Unincorporated communities in Illinois